Shedden may refer to:

People
 Shedden (surname), notable people with the name

Places
Shedden, Algoma District, Ontario, now called Spanish
Shedden, Elgin County, Ontario
Coboconk, Ontario, known as Shedden in the 1870s

Other uses
 Shedden massacre, a 2006 gang-related crime in Elgin County, Ontario